BCX is a free, open source BASIC to C/C++ computer language translator started by Kevin Diggins in 1999.  The current official BCX website https://BcxBasicCoders.com came online in October 2019, following several years of non-development.
Maintenance and new development is again being led by Kevin Diggins and Robert Wishlaw.

BCX converts a common procedural form of BASIC source code to C/C++ source code that can be compiled using many C/C++ compilers for Microsoft Windows.  For many years, most implementations of BASIC shared a nagging drawback - BASIC programs performed slower than similar programs that were created using C/C++.  BCX helped change that by giving BASIC programmers the joy of programming in a modern BASIC language while coupling its output with the high performance of a C/C++ compiler.

BCX is written in the BCX BASIC language, making BCX a self-translating translator. BCX was made an open source project in 2004.Since then, several members of the BCX community have led the development and maintenance of the BCX project.  Past project forks have resulted in variants of BCX that helped produce applications for Linux, Apple, and Atari operating systems.

BCX contains statements and functions that simplify the creation of Windows desktop applications.  Unlike many BASIC implementations that rely on run-time engines and/or frameworks, the combination of BCX and most C/C++ compilers produce small, efficient, high-performing native code applications. BCX assists in creating desktop, library, and console apps for 32-bit and 64-bit versions of Windows using only the Microsoft Windows Application Programming Interface (WINAPI).

External links
BCX website (2021)  https://bcxbasiccoders.com 
BCX Online Help System 
BCX Discussion Forum 
BCX on SourceForge

References 

Notes

 CNET .
 SourceForge .
 RJP .
 GotBASIC .

Free software programmed in BASIC
Cross-compilers
BASIC programming language family
C (programming language)
C++
Free compilers and interpreters